John Jay Iselin (December 8, 1933 – May 6, 2008) was a magazine and television journalist, editor, and publisher. He served as president of WNET, president of the Cooper Union, and president of the Marconi Foundation at Columbia University.

Early life
Iselin was born on December 8, 1933 in Greenville, South Carolina. He was a son of Fanny ( Humphreys) Iselin, and William Jay Iselin, a New York banker who moved his family South, where he owned cotton mills, during the Great Depression. His father died in an airplane crash in Europe in April 1951.

His paternal grandparents were Eleanor ( Jay) Iselin (a daughter of Col. William Jay) and Arthur Iselin (grandson of Adrian Georg Iselin). Through his father, his fourth great-grandfather was United States founding father John Jay, the first Chief Justice of the United States Supreme Court, and through his mother, he was descended from Benjamin Franklin. His maternal grandfather was Richard Duane Humphreys of Barnstable, Mount Kisco, New York.

Iselin was a graduate of St. Mark's School, and Harvard University, where he served as Managing Editor of the Crimson. In 1959, he was selected as a Marshall Scholar, and in 2001 became founding Chairman of the New York Marshall Committee. After Harvard, he went to Cambridge University where he studied law and received a master's degree before returning to Harvard where he earned a Ph.D. in government in 1964.

Career
In the early 1960s, Iselin went to work for Newsweek, covering the U.S. Department of Justice under Robert F. Kennedy before becoming national affairs editor. He then succeeded Cass Canfield Jr. as publisher of the trade division of Harper & Row, before becoming general manager of WNET in 1971. He later became president of WNET in 1973 and served in that role until his resignation in October 1986, remaining at the helm until the board named his successor, Dr. William F. Baker.

From 1988 to 2000, Iselin was appointed president of The Cooper Union for the Advancement of Science and Art. During his years as president, "he completed a $50 million capital campaign, created endowed professorships in the schools of art, architecture and engineering and added new trustees and new deans for art and the humanities. In 2000 he became president of the Marconi Foundation, based at Columbia University, which supports innovations in telecommunications." He was also an adjunct faculty member of the Columbia University Graduate School of Journalism.

Personal life
He was married to Josephine Lea Iselin, a partner in the New York law firm of Lankenau, Kovner & Kurtz. For over forty years, he spent his summers in Vinalhaven, Maine and had a family farm in Ghent, New York. Together, they were the parents of five children, including:

 William Jay Iselin, who married Claudia Rose Thompson, in 1988.
 Josephine Lea Iselin, who married Kenneth Andrew Pearce in 1991.
 Fannie Humphreys Iselin, who married sculptor Christopher Manning Minot, sister of Susan Minot, in 1991.
 Alison Jay Iselin, who married Daniel Jonathan Russell in 1995.

Iselin died of pneumonia on May 6, 2008 in New York City. At his death, he was survived by five children and thirteen grandchildren.

References

1933 births
2008 deaths
Presidents of Cooper Union
John Jay
St. Mark's School (Massachusetts) alumni
Marshall Scholars
Columbia University Graduate School of Journalism faculty
People from Greenville, South Carolina
People from Vinalhaven, Maine
The Harvard Crimson people
Jay family